Thomas, Tom, or Tommy Banks may refer to:

Arts
Thomas Banks (1735–1805), English sculptor
Thomas Joseph Banks (1828–1896), also known as Thomas John Banks, British painter
Thomas P. Banks (1848–1888), Australian church organist
Tom Banks (EastEnders), a character in the British soap opera EastEnders
Tommy Banks (1936–2018), Canadian composer/conductor

Sports
Thomas Banks (rugby league), rugby league footballer of the 1930s for England, and Huddersfield
Tom Banks (American football) (born 1948), former NFL center
Tom Banks (Australian rules footballer) (1867–1919), player and administrator with Fitzroy Football Club
Tom Banks (rugby league), rugby league footballer of the 1930s and 1940s for Castleford
Tom Banks (rugby union, born 1858) (1858–?), rugby union footballer of the 1880s for British Isles, and Swinton
Tom Banks (rugby union, born 1994), Australian international rugby union footballer
Tommy Banks (American football) (born  1979), former American football fullback
Tommy Banks (footballer) (born 1929), English footballer

Other
Thomas Banks (priest) (died 1634), Dean of St Asaph
Thomas Christopher Banks (1765–1854), British genealogist
Tom Banks (physicist) (born 1949), American physicist
Tommy Banks (chef) (born 1989), British chef

See also
Thomas Banks Cabaniss (1835–1915), American politician from Georgia